Minnesota State Highway 317 (MN 317) is a short  highway in northwest Minnesota, which runs from North Dakota Highway 17 at the North Dakota state line, at the Red River, and continues east to its eastern terminus at its intersection with Minnesota State Highway 220 in Fork Township.

Route description
Highway 317 serves as a short east–west connector route in northwest Minnesota between State Highway 220 and North Dakota Highway 17.  Highway 17 continues west to nearby Interstate 29 and the city of Grafton, North Dakota. The short route of Highway 317 is located between the Red River and the Snake River.

History
MN 317 was authorized on April 24, 1959. The route was paved in 1963.

Major intersections

References

External links

Highway 317 at the Unofficial Minnesota Highways Page

317
Transportation in Marshall County, Minnesota